Vujasinović is a Serbian surname, a patronymic derived from the male given name Vujasin. Notable people with the surname include:

Dada Vujasinović (1964–1994), Serbian journalist
Daniel Vujasinović (born 1989), Slovenian basketball player
Miroslav Vujasinović, handball coach
Vladimir Vujasinović (born 1973), Serbian water polo player
Vladimir Vujasinović (footballer) (born 1989), Serbian football goalkeeper

See also
Vujadinović

Serbian surnames